David Neil Ireland  (24 August 1927 – 26 July 2022) was an Australian novelist.

Biography
David Ireland was born in Lakemba in New South Wales in 1927.

Before taking up full-time writing in 1973, he undertook the classic writer's apprenticeship by working in a variety of jobs, ranging from greenskeeper to an extended period in an oil refinery.

This latter job inspired his second (and best-known) novel, The Unknown Industrial Prisoner, which brought him recognition in the early 1970s. It is still considered by many critics to be one of the best and most original Australian novels of the period.

He won the Miles Franklin Award three times (1971, 1976 and 1979). He is one of only four Australian writers to win the Award more than twice; the others are Thea Astley (4) and Tim Winton (4), and Peter Carey (3).

Ireland died on 26 July 2022 aged 94.

Honours and awards
 1966 – winner The Advertiser Literary Competition for The Chantic Bird
 1971 – winner Miles Franklin Award for The Unknown Industrial Prisoner
 1976 – winner Miles Franklin Award for The Glass Canoe
 1979 – winner Miles Franklin Award for A Woman of the Future
 1980 – joint winner The Age Book of the Year Award A Woman of the Future
 1985 – winner Australian Literature Society Gold Medal for Archimedes and the Seagle

He was appointed a Member of the Order of Australia (AM) in the Queen's Birthday Honours of June 1981.

Bibliography

Novels
 The Chantic Bird (1968)
 The Unknown Industrial Prisoner (1971)
 The Flesheaters (1972)
 Burn (1974)
 The Glass Canoe (1976)
 A Woman of the Future (1979)
 City of Women (1981)
 Archimedes and the Seagle (1984)
 Bloodfather (1987)
 The Chosen (1997)
 The World Repair Video Game (2015)

Drama
 Image in the Clay (1964)

References

External links
 
 David Ireland's Australian theatre credits at AusStage

1927 births
2022 deaths
Miles Franklin Award winners
ALS Gold Medal winners
Members of the Order of Australia
Writers from New South Wales
20th-century Australian novelists
Australian male novelists